Stephen J Yohay (alternatively Steven J Yohay) is principal shareholder and chief executive officer of the ACI healthcare group, comprising AREBA Casriel, Inc. Yohay is also involved in musical theater, having invested in such Broadway hits as The Producers, Hairspray, Sweeney Todd, and Little Shop of Horrors.

Background
Stephen Yohay was born in 1950 in New York. He attended New York University.

Struggle with addiction
At seventeen, an automobile accident changed the course of Yohay's life. Not only did he lose his fiancé, but he also witnessed her decapitation. Soon thereafter, he became addicted to heroin.  By age 20 Yohay had a hundred-dollar-a-day habit.

Yohay earned his degree in psychology from New York University in 1977 and also received New York State certification as an alcoholism and substance abuse counselor.

Yohay is involved in numerous philanthropic endeavors, having contributed generously to AIPAC, Hadassah, and B'nai Zion. He has been the recipient of a number of awards and honors in recognition of these contributions.

Yohay's grandmother read an article by Daniel H. Casriel, MD, a New York psychiatrist who had extended his private practice to include a dozen beds for rehabilitating drug addicts. A special arrangement was made with Dr. Casriel, who was moved by Stephen's mother's plea, "am I not as entitled as a rich person to see my son live?" The Yohays got their son admitted, though the treatment consumed a significant portion of the family's life savings. Yohay's resolve to find a cure for his condition manifested early, and he completed treatment within one year.

Career
Yohay impressed the staff with his grasp of substance-abuse theory and he became Casriel's protégé as a counselor trainee.  Yohay's ascent within the company was rapid.  He went from being a counselor-trainee in 1971 to assistant resident director in 1972. In 1973, Yohay became resident director, and executive director in 1975. He became chief executive officer in 1972.  Through his training and experience at ACI, Yohay acquired sufficient expertise to have contributed a number of scholarly articles on the subject to notable journals.

In 1983, Casriel developed amyotrophic lateral sclerosis, also known as Lou Gehrig's disease, or ALS. Yohay, by this time the proprietor of the company, envisioned a significant expansion of the scope of the treatment center, moving it to a 100-bed facility at its current home on 57th Street.  Yohay built ACI into a prominent facility for substance abuse treatment in the New York area.  It soon became licensed and accredited.  It is the oldest private facility for such treatment in the country.  Under Yohay's tutelage, ACI became the foundation of the creation of a number of other healthcare companies offering a wide range of medical services including diagnostics  and treatment, as well as managed care.  

In 2000, Yohay was awarded the title of Counselor Emeritus by the New York State Office of Alcoholism and Substance Abuse Services.

In 2002, Stephen Yohay founded NineEleven CaseManagement, Inc., which was provided a contract to manage all of the mental health and substance abuse benefits for the victim of the September 11 attacks against the original World Trade Center in 2001 and their families. This effort was funded by the September 11th Fund.

Notes

1950 births
Living people
American substance abuse counselors
New York University Grossman School of Medicine alumni
American health care chief executives
https://oig.hhs.gov/fraud/enforcement/steven-yohay-agreed-to-be-excluded-for-15-years-for-inducing-medicaid-beneficiaries-for-enrolling-medicaid-patients-in-substance-abuse-treatment-through-kickbacks/